Blepharomyia piliceps is a species of fly in the family Tachinidae.

Distribution
Austria, Bulgaria, Czech Republic, Denmark, Finland, Germany, Netherlands, Norway, Poland, Slovakia, Spain, Sweden, Switzerland and United Kingdom

References

Diptera of Europe
Dexiinae
Insects described in 1859
Taxa named by Johan Wilhelm Zetterstedt